Hermann Mayr can refer to:

 Hermann Mayr (luger), a West German luger
 Hermann Mayr (skier) (born 1929), an Austrian cross-country skier